Travis Ramsey (born May 16, 1983) is an American former professional ice hockey player. After playing four seasons with the Manitoba Moose of the American Hockey League (AHL), Ramsey followed the franchise after it was relocated by the Winnipeg Jets to sign with the St. John's IceCaps on  July 20, 2011.

Career statistics

References

External links 

1983 births
American men's ice hockey defensemen
Ice hockey players from California
Living people
Maine Black Bears men's ice hockey players
Manitoba Moose players
People from Lakewood, California
St. John's IceCaps players
Victoria Salmon Kings players
Sportspeople from Los Angeles County, California
Great Falls Americans players
Salmon Arm Silverbacks players
Ritten Sport players
American expatriate ice hockey players in Italy
Long Beach Polytechnic High School alumni